The First Baptist Church in America is the First Baptist Church of Providence, Rhode Island, also known as the First Baptist Meetinghouse. It is the oldest Baptist church congregation in the United States, founded in 1638 by Roger Williams in Providence, Rhode Island. The present church building was erected between 1774 and 75 and held its first meetings in May 1775. It is located at 75 North Main Street in Providence's College Hill neighborhood. It was designated a National Historic Landmark in 1960. It is affiliated with the American Baptist Churches USA.

History

Roger Williams had been holding religious services in his home for nearly a year before he converted his congregation into a Baptist church in 1638. This followed his founding of Providence in 1636. For the next sixty years, the congregation met in congregants' homes, or outdoors in pleasant weather. Baptists in Rhode Island through most of the 17th century declined to erect meetinghouses because they felt such buildings reflected vanity. Eventually, however, they came to see the utility of some gathering place, and they erected severely plain-style meetinghouses like those of the Quakers.

Roger Williams was a Calvinist, but within a few years of its founding, the congregation became more Arminian, and was clearly a General Six-Principle Baptist church by 1652. It remained a General Baptist church until it migrated back to a variety of Calvinism under the leadership of James Manning in the 1770s. Following Williams as pastor of the church was Chad Brown, founder of the famous Brown family of Rhode Island. A number of the streets in Providence bear the names of pastors of First Baptist Church, including Williams, Brown, Gregory Dexter, Thomas Olney, William Wickenden, Manning, and Stephen Gano. In 1700, Pardon Tillinghast built the first church building, a  structure, near the corner of Smith and North Main Streets. In 1711 he donated the building and land to the church in a deed describing the church as General Six-Principle Baptist in theology. In 1736 the congregation built its second meetinghouse on an adjoining lot at the corner of Smith and North Main Streets. This building was about 40 × 40 feet square (i.e.).

When it was built in 1774–75, the current meetinghouse represented a dramatic departure from the traditional Baptist meetinghouse style. It was the first Baptist meetinghouse to have a steeple and bell, making it more like Anglican and Congregational church buildings. The builders were part of a movement among Baptists in the urban centers of Boston, Newport, New York, and Philadelphia to bring respectability and recognition to Baptists.

Association with Brown University
Central to the movement for greater recognition and growth was the creation of an educated ministry and the founding of a college. The Philadelphia Association of Baptist Churches sent Dr. James Manning to Rhode Island to found the college in the colony of Rhode Island and Providence Plantations (later renamed Brown University) in 1764. Beginning in Warren, the college then relocated to Providence in 1770. The college president, Manning, was also called to be the pastor of the Providence church in 1771. During his ministry the present Meeting House was erected "for the publick worship of Almighty God and also for holding commencement in." Subsequent Brown presidents Jonathan Maxcy and Francis Wayland also served as ministers at the church.

The Brown family that soon gave its name to the university were prominent members of the church, and descendants of its founders and those of the Rhode Island Colony (the second pastor of the congregation after Roger Williams was Chad Brown). Although the university is now secular, in honor of its history and tradition, the meetinghouse continues to be used, as it has been since 1776, as the site of Brown University's undergraduate commencement.

Construction, alterations and designations 
Construction of the church began in the summer of 1774; at the time, the project was the largest building project ever attempted in New England. Due to the closure of the Massachusetts ports by the British as punishment for the Boston Tea Party, out-of-work ship builders and carpenters came to Providence to work on the meetinghouse. The main portion of the meetinghouse was dedicated in mid-May 1775, and the steeple erected in three and a half days in the first week of June.

Notable additions to the meetinghouse have included a Waterford crystal chandelier given by Hope Brown Ives (1792), a large pipe organ given by her brother Nicholas Brown Jr., the younger (1834); the addition of rooms for Sunday school, a fellowship hall, and offices on the lower level (1819–59), and an addition to the east end of the meetinghouse to accommodate an indoor baptistery (1884). The 1884 addition included a large stained glass window that was soon deemed inappropriate and shuttered over.

In 1957, John D. Rockefeller Jr. funded a restoration effort that removed Victorian additions to the building, returning much of the church's interior to its original appearance.

Notably absent from the interior is a gallery originally constructed on the church's western side for use by slaves and free black residents of Providence.

The building was designated as a National Historic Landmark in 1960, and listed on the National Register of Historic Places in 1966.

Architecture 
The building was designed by astronomer and amateur architect Joseph Brown. Brown's design borrowed significantly from the designs English architect James Gibbs published in his 1728 Book of Architecture. The church's steeple, for example, is an exact execution of one of three unbuilt designs for the spire of St Martin-in-the-Fields.

Today
In addition to weekly worship services, the Meeting House hosts concerts, talks, and lectures by world-renowned artists, performers, academics, and elected officials. Brown University holds commencement services of its undergraduate college at the meetinghouse.

In 2001, History professor J. Stanley Lemons wrote a history of the church, entitled First: The History of the First Baptist Church in America

Affiliations
The First Baptist Church in America is affiliated with the American Baptist Churches of Rhode Island (ABCORI) and the American Baptist Churches USA (ABCUSA). The church actively supports the Rhode Island State Council of Churches, the National Council of Churches, the Baptist World Alliance, and the Baptist Joint Committee for Religious Liberty. Many members have served in various denominational, academic, and divinity school positions, including the presidency of Brown University.

Gallery

Settled ministers (sometimes simultaneous pastorships)

Roger Williams, 1638–39
Chad Brown, 1639 – before 1650
Thomas Olney, 1639–1652
William Wickenden, 1642–1670
Gregory Dexter, 1654–1700
Pardon Tillinghast, 1681–1718
Ebenezer Jenckes 1719–1726
 James Colvin 1725-1755
James Brown 1726–1732
Samuel Winsor, 1733–1758
Thomas Burlingame 1733–1764
Samuel Winsor Jr, 1759–1771
James Manning, 1771–1791
John Stanford, 1788–1789
Jonathan Maxcy, 1791–1792
Stephen Gano MD, 1792–1828
Robert Pattison, 1830–36
William Hague, 1837–40
Robert Pattison, 1840–1842
James Granger, 1842–1857

Francis Wayland, 1857–1858
Samuel Caldwell, 1858–1873
Edward G. Taylor, 1875–1881
Thomas Edwin Brown, 1882–1890
Henry Melville King, 1891–1906
Elijah Abraham Hanley, 1907–1911
John F. Vichert, 1912–1916
Albert B. Cohoe, 1916–1920
Arthur W. Cleaves, 1922–1940
Albert C. Thomas, 1941–1954
Homer L. Trickett, 1955–1970
Robert G. Withers, 1971–1975
Richard D. Bausman, 1976–1982
Orland L. Tibbetts, 1983–1986
Dwight M. Lundgren, 1983–1996
Kate Harvey Penfield, 1987–1995
Clifford R. Hockensmith, 1997–1999
James C. Miller, 2000–2005
Dan Ivins, 2006–2014
Jamie P. Washam, 2015–

See also

List of tallest buildings in Providence, Rhode Island
Oldest churches in the United States
List of National Historic Landmarks in Rhode Island
National Register of Historic Places listings in Providence, Rhode Island

References

External links

Meeting House info 

SAH Archipedia entry 

Baptist churches in Rhode Island
17th-century Baptist churches
Religious organizations established in the 1630s
Georgian architecture in Rhode Island
1638 establishments in Rhode Island
Churches completed in 1775
Brown University
National Historic Landmarks in Rhode Island
Churches on the National Register of Historic Places in Rhode Island
Towers in Rhode Island
American Baptist Churches USA
Churches in Providence, Rhode Island
Historic American Buildings Survey in Rhode Island
18th-century Baptist churches in the United States
National Register of Historic Places in Providence, Rhode Island
Historic district contributing properties in Rhode Island